Cardston was a provincial electoral district in Alberta, Canada, mandated to return a single member to the Legislative Assembly of Alberta from 1905 to 1993.

History

Cardston was one of the original 25 electoral districts contested in the 1905 Alberta general election upon Alberta joining Confederation in September 1905. The district was carried over from the old Cardston electoral district which returned a single member to the Legislative Assembly of the Northwest Territories from 1902 to 1905. The member for the Northwest Territories seat, John William Woolf would be elected in the 1905 Alberta general election.

The riding has always occupied the most southern portion of the province along the Canada / United States border.

The Cardston electoral district was abolished in the 1993 electoral boundary re-distribution, with the borders of the Pincher Creek-Crowsnest electoral district shifted south into Cardston, and the district was renamed Cardston-Chief Mountain.

The riding was named after the Town of Cardston and this region is considered one of the most conservative in the province.

Boundary history

Election results

1905 general election
The 1905 election was between Liberal candidate John William Woolf and Conservative candidate John Parrish. Woolf was well known rancher and politician in the area. He had served as the district representative in the Northwest Territories Legislature from 1902 to 1905. Woolf also served briefly on the local government as a municipal councilor in the town of Cardston. Woolf won the district on election day easily defeating Parish with a landslide taking nearly 70% of the popular vote.

1909 general election

1912 by-election

1913 general election

1917 general election

1921 general election

1926 general election

1930 general election

1935 general election

1940 general election

1944 general election

1948 general election

1952 general election

1955 general election

1959 general election

1963 general election

1967 general election

1971 general election

1975 general election

1979 general election

1982 general election

1986 general election

1989 general election

Plebiscite results

1948 Electrification Plebiscite
District results from the first province wide plebiscite on electricity regulation.

1957 liquor plebiscite

On October 30, 1957 a stand-alone plebiscite was held province wide in all 50 of the provincial electoral districts in Alberta. The government decided to consult Alberta voters to decide on liquor sales and mixed drinking after a divisive debate in the Legislature. The plebiscite was intended to deal with the growing demand for reforming antiquated liquor control laws.

The plebiscite was conducted in two parts. Question A asked in all districts, asked the voters if the sale of liquor should be expanded in Alberta, while Question B asked in a handful of districts within the corporate limits of Calgary and Edmonton asked if men and woman were allowed to drink together in establishments.

Province wide Question A of the plebiscite passed in 33 of the 50 districts while Question B passed in all five districts. Cardston recorded the strongest vote in the province against expanded sale of liquor, this was likely due to the strong Mormon communities in the district, which had made Cardston a dry city since 1904. The district also recorded a strong voter turnout. It was well above the province wide average of 46 percent.

Official district returns were released to the public on December 31, 1957. At first the Social Credit government said it did not consider the results binding, but soon the government repealed the existing liquor legislation and introduced an entirely new Liquor Act.

Municipal districts lying inside electoral districts that voted against expanded liquor sales such as Cardston were designated Local Option Zones by the Alberta Liquor Control Board and considered effective dry zones, business owners that wanted a license had to petition for a binding municipal plebiscite in order to be granted a license.

See also
List of Alberta provincial electoral districts

References

Further reading

External links
Elections Alberta
The Legislative Assembly of Alberta

Former provincial electoral districts of Alberta
1905 establishments in Alberta
1993 disestablishments in Alberta